Tom Fowler is a Canadian cartoonist living in Ottawa, Ontario, Canada.

His published work includes Monroe feature in the MAD magazine, Mysterius the Unfathomable, Quantum & Woody, Green Arrow, Venom, Hulk: Season One, Prince of Persia: Before the Sandstorm and Howtoons: [Re]Ignition. He has also illustrated several cards in the Doomtown collectible card game. In 2016, he made his writing debut on Oni Press' Rick and Morty series, writing the arcs "Head-Space", "The Noble Pursuit of Fair Play", and "Big Game".

Bibliography
Interior comic work includes:
 Oni Double Feature #12-13: "The Honor Rollers" (with Paul Dini, anthology, Oni Press, 1999)
 Star Wars Tales #3: "The Death of Captain Tarpals" (with Ryder Windham, anthology, Dark Horse, 2000)
 The Blair Witch Chronicles #3: "Magik Circle" (with Jen Van Meter, Oni Press, 2000)
 Oni Press Color Special #2: "Adventure #206" (script and art, anthology, Oni Press, 2001)
 Paper Museum (anthology, Jungle Boy Press):
 "Saxon the Swordsman" (with Jai Nitz, in #1, 2002)
 "Lamb's War" (script and art, in #2, 2003)
 Star Wars: Jango Fett (with Ron Marz, graphic novel, Dark Horse, 2002)
 Grendel: Red, White and Black #1: "Devil's Dash" (with Matt Wagner, anthology, Maverick, 2002)
 Batman: Legends of the Dark Knight #168: "Urban Legend" (with Bill Willingham, DC Comics, 2003)
 Caper #9-12: "On Ice" (with Judd Winick, DC Comics, 2004)
 MAD (anthology magazine, DC Comics):
 "When Spider-Man Goes Completely International" (with David Shayne, among other artists, in #448, 2004)
 "20 Dumbest People, Events and Things of 2004" (with Desmond Devlin, among other writers and artists, in #449, 2005)
 "Monroe" (with Anthony Barbieri, in #470-482, 484, 486-487, 489-491, 493, 495-496, 498 and 502, 2006–2010)
 "50 Worst Things About Advertising" (with Jeff Kruse and Scott Maiko, among other artists, in #482, 2007)
 "Great Monkeys in American History" (with Teresa Burns Parkhurst, in #488, 2008)
 Zombie Tales: Oblivion: "Memento Mori" (with John Rogers, anthology one-shot, Boom! Studios, 2005)
 Green Arrow vol. 3 #46-48, 50, 52 (with Judd Winick and Tommy Castillo (#50), DC Comics, 2005)
 The Grimoire #7 (with Chris Stone, Speakeasy, 2005)
 Revolution on the Planet of the Apes #3-4, 6 (with Joe O'Brien, Ty Templeton and Salgood Sam (#6), Mr. Comics, 2006)
 Justice League Unlimited #29: "Untamed" (inks on Carlo Barberi, written by Adam Beechen, Johnny DC, 2007)
 Pushing Daisies #0: "Head" (layouts for Zach Howard, written by Bryan Fuller, Wildstorm, 2007)
 Mysterius the Unfathomable #1-6 (with Jeff Parker, Wildstorm, 2009)
 Prince of Persia: Before the Sandstorm (with Jordan Mechner and various artists, graphic novel, Disney Press, 2010)
 I am an Avenger #1: "Welcome Home, Squirrel Girl!" (with Alex Zalben, anthology, Marvel, 2010)
 Deadpool Team-Up #888 (with Cullen Bunn, Marvel, 2010)
 Venom vol. 2 #3, 5-8 (with Rick Remender and Tony Moore (#5), Marvel, 2011)
 Outlaw Territory Volume 2: "Rustling Up Business..." (with Rich Johnston, anthology graphic novel, Image, 2011)
 Jim Henson's The Storyteller Volume 1: "Old Fire Dragaman" (with Jeff Parker, anthology graphic novel, Archaia, 2011)
 Hulk: Season One (with Fred Van Lente, graphic novel, Marvel, 2012)
 Time Warp: "It's Full of Demons" (with Tom King, anthology one-shot, Vertigo, 2013)
 The Thrilling Adventure Hour: "Beyond Belief" (with Ben Acker and Ben Blacker, anthology graphic novel, Archaia, 2013)
 Quantum and Woody vol. 2 #1–4, 0 (with James Asmus, Valiant, 2013–2014)
 Creepy vol. 2 #14: "Black Feathers"(with Ray Fawkes, anthology, Dark Horse, 2013)
 X-O Manowar vol. 3 #25: "Battle for the Ages" (script and art, co-feature, Valiant, 2014)
 Nick Dragotta's Howtoons: [Re]Igniton #1–5 (with Fred Van Lente, Image, 2014)
 CBLDF Presents Liberty Annual '14: "Little Star" (script and art, with Jeff Parker, anthology, Image, 2014)
 Sensation Comics vol. 2 Chapter 31–32: "Return of Gaia" (with Derek Fridolfs, digital, DC Comics, 2015)
 Rick and Morty (as writer, Oni Press):
 "Head-Space" (with CJ Cannon, in #12–14, 2016)
 "The Noble Pursuit of Fair Play" (script and art, in #15, 2016)
 "Big Game" (script and art, in Treasury Edition #2, 2016)
 The Unbeatable Squirrel Girl (Marvel):
 Volume 2 #9–10 (inks on Erica Henderson, written by Ryan North, 2016)
 ...Beats Up the Marvel Universe (inks on Erica Henderson, written by Ryan North, graphic novel, 2016)
 "Brain Drain's Olde-Tyme Feel-Good Inspirational Corner" (with Ryan North, co-feature in vol. 2 #26, 2018)
 Doom Patrol vol. 6 #6, 8–11 (inks on Nick Derington, written by Gerard Way, DC's Young Animal, 2017–2018)
 Where We Live: "Everything After" (with Justin Jordan, anthology graphic novel, Image, 2018)
 The Sandman Universe (with Kat Howard and other writers and artists, anthology one-shot, Vertigo, 2018)
 The Books of Magic vol. 3 #1–ongoing (with Kat Howard and Brian Churilla, Vertigo/DC Black Label, 2018–...)
 Dial H for Hero #4: "Detroit City Blues" (inks on Joe Quinones, written by Sam Humphries, DC Comics, 2019)

Covers only

References

External links

Canadian cartoonists
Canadian comics artists
Living people
Artists from Ottawa
Year of birth missing (living people)
Mad (magazine) cartoonists